Cryptops megalopora is a species of centipede in the Cryptopidae family. It is native to Australia and New Zealand and was first described in 1887 by German entomologist Erich Haase.

Distribution
The species’ range includes New Zealand and the Australian island of Tasmania.

Behaviour
The centipedes are solitary terrestrial predators that inhabit plant litter, soil and rotting wood.

References

 

 
megalopora
Centipedes of Australia
Fauna of Tasmania
Centipedes of New Zealand
Animals described in 1887
Taxa named by Erich Haase